Brenthe was a town of ancient Arcadia in the district Cynuria, near the right bank of the river Alpheius, and on a small tributary called Brentheates (Βρενθεάτης), only 5 stadia in length.

Its site is located near the modern Karytaina.

References

Populated places in ancient Arcadia
Former populated places in Greece